A Def Needle In Tomorrow is the second album from the American indie rock band The Comas. It was released in 2000 via Yep Roc Records.

Production
The album was produced by Brian Paulson.

Critical reception
Indy Week wrote that the band's "cloudy, creamy, country-tinged dreampop—with violin by ... Margaret White, a strong female vocal presence, and a drummer toying with a sampler—stood out from the masculine rock energy that still pervaded Chapel Hill." The Morning Star wrote that the Comas' "songs are awash in beautiful, hazy melodies, layers of guitar, keyboard fills and the sly, thin vocals of frontman Andy Herod." PopMatters thought that it "hinted at greatness, even if it didn't always deliver."

Track listing
All songs written by Andrew Herod.

Personnel
Laird Dixon - Guitar
Nicole Gehweiler -  Guitar, Keyboards, Photography, Vocals
John Harrison -  Drums, Sampling, Turntables
Andrew Herod -  Casio, Drawing, Guitar, Vocals
Margaret White Bass, Violin, Vocals

References

External links
Official site

2000 albums
The Comas albums
Yep Roc Records albums